Goodbye Youth (Italian: Addio, giovinezza!) is a 1940 Italian "white-telephones" drama film directed by Ferdinando Maria Poggioli and starring María Denis, Adriano Rimoldi and Clara Calamai. The film was adapted from the 1911 play of the same name by Nino Oxilia and Sandro Camasio, which had been adapted into films on three previous occasions. The film was a breakthrough role for Calamai who emerged as a leading star of Italian cinema during the 1940s. It was made at the Cinecittà studios in Rome and the Fert Studios in Turin.

Synopsis
The film is set in Turin at the beginning of the twentieth century, where a student (Rimoldi) begins a romance with a seamstress Dorina (Denis). However, he is lured away by a sophisticated older woman (Calamai) to Dorina's distress.

Cast
 María Denis as Dorina  
 Adriano Rimoldi as Mario  
 Clara Calamai as Elena  
 Carlo Campanini as Leone  
 Bianca Della Corte as Emma  
 Carlo Minello as Carlo  
 Paolo Carlini as Pino  
 Bella Starace Sainati as La madre di Dorina  
 Aldo Fiorelli as Ernesto  
 Mario Giannini as Giovanni 
 Umberto Bonsignori as Tito  
 Mario Casaleggio as Il padre di Mario  
 Nuccia Robella as La madre di Mario 
 Vera Carmi as La fidanzata di Giovanni  
 Franca Volpini as La fidanzata di Ernesto  
 Arturo Bragaglia as Marco, il ciabattino  
 Walter Grant as L'anziano signore, amante di Elena  
 Piera Romati as Una ragazza al bar  
 Maria-Pia Vivaldi as Un'altra ragazza al bar

See also
 Goodbye Youth (1918)
 Goodbye Youth (1927)

References

Bibliography 
Gundle, Stephen. Mussolini's Dream Factory: Film Stardom in Fascist Italy. Berghahn Books, 2013.

External links 

Goodbye Youth at Variety Distribution

1940 films
Italian historical drama films
Italian black-and-white films
1940s historical drama films
1940s Italian-language films
Films directed by Ferdinando Maria Poggioli
Italian films based on plays
Films set in Turin
Films set in the 1900s
Remakes of Italian films
Sound film remakes of silent films
Films shot at Cinecittà Studios
1940 drama films
Films scored by Enzo Masetti
1940s Italian films